Xylota coquilletti is a species of hoverfly in the family Syrphidae.

Distribution
Taiwan, Japan.

References

Eristalinae
Insects described in 1914
Diptera of Asia